Dr Cullen Park, known for sponsorship reasons as Netwatch Cullen Park, is a GAA stadium in Carlow, County Carlow, Ireland. It is the home of the Carlow Gaelic football and hurling teams. It has a capacity of 21,000.

History
The ground's establishment was first mooted in 1935. Dr Cullen Park was officially opened on 9 August 1936 by Patrick McNamee of the GAA. A total expenditure of £3,590 and 15 shillings was accounted for at the first audit. This sum included the purchase of the land.

Dr Cullen Park was officially opened on Sunday 9 August 1936. It was named in honour of Dr Matthew Cullen (Catholic Bishop of Kildare and Leighlin 1927–36) who had died on 2 January 1936. The late Bishop was honoured as "a great churchman, a true-hearted gael and a patriotic Irishman". Thomas Ryan President of County Carlow GAA presided at the ceremony. Padraig McNamee, President of the Ulster Council of the GAA represented the President of the Association. A number of local dignitaries also attended including James Reddy, who was the County Secretary during the early 1898–1890 period.

By the 1960s, Dr Cullen Park still lacked a stand. However, it did have a fine playing pitch newly fenced, to prevent encroachment by spectators. The park was also equipped with good dressing rooms, hot and cold water and showers, a referee's dressing room and board rooms.

In the summer of 1967, major improvements were carried out. A tarmac apron around the main entrance was provided. Wrought iron entrance gates, inscribed "Páirc an Cullainaigh" were built by Joseph Bennett Steel Contractors of Stradbally, Co. Laois. This firm were also the builders of the entrance gates to Fr. Maher Park in Graiguecullen on the Laois side of Carlow town. The first match played in Dr Cullen park was the Leinster Junior Football Final Kildare v Wicklow, this match was played on 2 August 1936 a week before the official opening.opening.

The ground hosted the first Friday night game in the history of the All-Ireland Senior Football Championship - a first round qualifier between Carlow and Laois.

See also
 List of Gaelic Athletic Association stadiums
 List of stadiums in Ireland by capacity

References

Buildings and structures in Carlow (town)
Carlow GAA
Gaelic games grounds in the Republic of Ireland
Sport in Carlow (town)
Sports venues in County Carlow